Frank Lander Saul (born 23 August 1943) is an English former professional footballer who played most of his career for Tottenham Hotspur.

Playing career 
Having started as a youth with Canvey Island F.C., he signed for Spurs in 1960, and was one of 17 players used by the club in the Double winning side of 1960–61. Before being involved in the swap with Southampton for Martin Chivers in 1968. Saul scored in the 1967 FA Cup Final against Chelsea. Saul joined Queens Park Rangers in 1970 and played 43 league games scoring 4 goals before moving to Millwall in 1972.

When Saul was sent off against Burnley at Turf Moor on 4 December 1965, he was the first Spurs' player to be sent off in a League match since 27 October 1928.

Later life 
After quitting football, Saul worked as a builder in Essex.

Honours 
Tottenham Hotspur
 F.A. Cup winner: 1967
 FA Charity Shield: 1967 (shared)

References 
 

1943 births
Living people
People from Canvey Island
Tottenham Hotspur F.C. players
Southampton F.C. players
Queens Park Rangers F.C. players
Millwall F.C. players
English Football League players
English footballers
Association football forwards
FA Cup Final players